The 1925 VFL Grand Final was an Australian rules football game contested between the Geelong Football Club and Collingwood Football Club, held at the Melbourne Cricket Ground in Melbourne on 10 October 1925. It was the 27th annual grand final of the Victorian Football League, staged to determine the premiers for the 1925 VFL season. The match, attended by 64,288 spectators, was won by Geelong by a margin of 10 points, marking that club's first VFL premiership victory.

Geelong, competing in their first VFL grand final, had been the best side all season, having lost only two games on their way to the minor premiership and at one stage put together a sequence of 12 successive wins. Collingwood on the other hand had only made the finals on percentage, a spot only cemented when they defeated South Melbourne by 65 points in the final round.

Geelong outscored Collingwood in each of the first three quarters to open up a 25-point lead going into the final term. Collingwood finished strongly but Geelong held on to claim its first VFL premiership. Captain-coach Cliff Rankin starred with five goals.

Tom Fitzmaurice had extra reason to celebrate, as it was his 100th VFL match and his third successive premiership, having won flags in the previous two seasons at Essendon.

Score

Teams

 Umpire – Jack McMurray Sr.

Statistics

Goalkickers

Aftermath
In describing the scenes following Geelong's first VFL premiership and the club's first premiership since 1886 (in the VFA), The Age reported:

See also
 1925 VFL season

References
1925 VFL Grand Final statistics from the AFL Tables
 The Official statistical history of the AFL 2004 
 Ross, J. (ed), 100 Years of Australian Football 1897–1996: The Complete Story of the AFL, All the Big Stories, All the Great Pictures, All the Champions, Every AFL Season Reported, Viking, (Ringwood), 1996.

External links
 1925 VFL Grand Final – BoylesFootballPhotos

VFL/AFL Grand Finals
Grand
Geelong Football Club
Collingwood Football Club
October 1925 sports events